Jerry Patton (born March 27, 1946, in Saginaw, Michigan – May 19, 1983) was an American football defensive lineman in the National Football League for the Minnesota Vikings, Buffalo Bills, Detroit Lions, Philadelphia Eagles, and the New England Patriots.  He played college football at the University of Nebraska.

1946 births
Sportspeople from Saginaw, Michigan
American football defensive linemen
Nebraska Cornhuskers football players
Minnesota Vikings players
Buffalo Bills players
Philadelphia Eagles players
New England Patriots players
1983 deaths